Edward William Toner Jr. (born March 22, 1968) is a former American football fullback who played in the National Football League. He played college football at Boston College.

College career
Toner finished his collegiate career at Boston College with 687 yards and 18 touchdowns on 202 carries and 41 receptions for 293 yards and three touchdowns.

Professional career
After going unselected in the 1991 NFL Draft, Toner was signed by the Indianapolis Colts as an undrafted free agent. He was cut during the preseason but was resigned for the 1992 season. After the 1994 season the Colts opted not to tender Toner a contract. He was signed by the Pittsburgh Steelers in April of 1995 but was waived during training camp.

Personal life
Toner's father, Ed Toner Sr, and uncle, Tom Toner, both played in the NFL.

References

1968 births
Living people
Boston College Eagles football players
Indianapolis Colts players
American football fullbacks
Players of American football from Massachusetts
Pittsburgh Steelers players